The R505 is a Regional Route in South Africa. It connects Ottoshoop, North West Province in the north with Wesselsbron, Free State Province to the south.

Route

North West
Its northern terminus is a junction with the R49 in the village of Ottoshoop, North West. From there it runs southwards for 50 km, past Bakerville, to Lichtenburg, where it reaches a junction with the R503 (Swart Street).

The R505 joins the R503 and they are one road into the town centre as Swart Street eastwards, then as Nelson Mandela Drive southwards, to meet the R52 at the Gerrit Maritz Street junction. The R52 joins the R503/R505 and all 3 routes share one road southwards as Nelson Mandela Drive before the R52 becomes its own road south-west. At the next junction, the R505 becomes its own road southwards.

From Lichtenburg, the R505 continues southwards for 76 kilometres, meeting the N14 National Route, to pass through the town centre of Ottosdal as Swart Street, where it intersects with the R507 (Voortrekker Street). From Ottosdal, the R505 continues southwards for 43 kilometres to reach a junction with the R504 in Wolmaransstad. The R505 joins the R504 and they are one road eastwards for 2 km, reaching a junction with the N12 National Route. The R505 then becomes co-signed with the N12 south-west for 2.5 km before becoming its own road southwards in Wolmaransstad's southern suburbs.

From Wolmaransstad, the R505 heads southwards for 10 km to the town of Makwassie, where it crosses the R502 at a staggered junction. From Makwassie, it resumes southwards for 37 km to cross the Vaal River into the Free State.

Free State
From the Vaal River crossing, the R505 heads south-east for 11 km to reach a junction with the R59. It proceeds south-east for 30 km to end at a junction with the R719 in the town of Wesselsbron (north of the town centre).

References 

Regional Routes in the Free State (province)
Regional Routes in North West (South African province)